Haro Senft (27 September 1928, Budweis, Czechoslovakia (now České Budějovice, Czech Republic – 4 February 2016, Munich) was a German filmmaker who was one of the founders of the New German Cinema movement. His short documentary film Kahl about the Kahl Nuclear Power Plant received an Academy Award for Documentary Short Subject nomination in 1961. In 2013, he received the Berlinale Camera award at the Berlin International Film Festival.

Selected filmography
 Kahl (1961, short documentary)
 The Smooth Career (1967)
  (1971)
  (1978)
 Jacob hinter der blauen Tür (1987)
 Lebewohl, Fremde (1991)

References

External links

Filmmaker's website (in German)

1928 births
2016 deaths
Cinema pioneers
Film people from České Budějovice
German documentary film directors
German film directors